Sulliman Johan Mazadou (born 11 April 1985 in Marignane, France) is a Nigerien footballer who plays for French club US Marignane in Championnat de France amateur. He is a member of Niger national football team played at 2012 Africa Cup of Nations against home team Gabon and one of the Niger's reserve players in match again Tunisia.

References 

1985 births
Living people
People with acquired Nigerien citizenship
Nigerien footballers
Niger international footballers
French footballers
French people of Nigerien descent
2012 Africa Cup of Nations players
Association football defenders
Marignane Gignac Côte Bleue FC players
Sportspeople from Bouches-du-Rhône
Footballers from Provence-Alpes-Côte d'Azur